Arnab Ray is an Indian novelist, blogger, podcaster who currently lives in the United States. While finishing his PhD at Stony Brook University, he started his blog with the name Random Thoughts of a Demented Mind, in August 2004, using Greatbong (bong is an Indian slang for Bengali) as his pen name. The blog focuses on satirical social and political commentary.

Ray embarked on his writing career with May I Hebb Your Attention Pliss, a non-fiction book that came out in 2010, and contained much of the commentary that Ray was known for by then through his blog. This was followed by The Mine, a psychological horror novel that came out in 2012, followed by books in the drama and crime-thriller genres. His last novel The Mahabharata Murders was adapted as a web series Mahabharat Murders on the Bengali OTT platform Hoichoi.

In 2019, Ray renamed his blog as The Greatbong Blog and started a podcast called Attention Pliss!.

Career
Ray was born and brought up in Kolkata. His father Alok Ray is an ex-professor of IIM Calcutta. He graduated from Jadavpur University as a Bachelor in Computer Science and Engineering and went on to finish his PhD in Computer Science from State University of New York at Stony Brook.

He is known for his sarcastic takes on the Indian film industry, Indian politics and society in general.  His blog, then called Random Thoughts of a Demented Mind, was awarded the "Indiblog of the Year" at Indibloggies in 2006 and 2008. He has written for several media outlets such as The Washington Post'''', Outlook magazine and Live Mint.

He is an agnostic with moderate political beliefs as he has written about in his many blog posts. His first book May I Hebb Your Attention Pliss, published by HarperCollins, was on India Today's Bestsellers list. His second book, The Mine, has also been well received. His third book, Yatrik  was published in September 2014. His fourth book Sultan of Delhi: Ascension, first of a two-part crime-drama, was released in October 2016.

The print version of fifth book The Mahabharata Murders, published by Juggernaut Books was released in August 2017, even as the e-version of the book was released through the publisher's app in India. It was adapted as a web series Mahabharat Murders on the Bengali OTT platform Hoichoi.

Novels
 May I Hebb Your Attention Pliss, HarperCollins, 2010  
 The Mine, Westland (Amazon), 2012 
 Yatrik, Westland, 2014 
 Sultan of Delhi: Ascension, Hachette India, 2016 
 The Mahabharata Murders, Juggernaut Books, 2017''

References

External links
The Greatbong Blog and Podcast

Indian bloggers
Living people
Jadavpur University alumni
American novelists of Indian descent
Indian agnostics
Indian emigrants to the United States
Stony Brook University alumni
Male bloggers
Year of birth missing (living people)
Indian writers
Indian male writers
Women podcasters
Indian podcasters
Writers from Kolkata
21st-century Bengalis
21st-century Indian writers
Bengali Hindus
People from Kolkata